Omar Taylor-Clarke (born 10 December 2003) is a Welsh professional footballer who plays for Bristol City of the EFL Championship.

Career
Born in Newport, Wales, Taylor-Clarke left the Cardiff City academy to join Bristol City from under-13 level. In October 2022 he signed a professional contract until 2025 with Bristol City. Taylor-Clarke was loaned to Yate Town in 2022 and he scored on his debut, a 6-0 win over Cinderford Town.

He was in the first team matchday squad for Bristol City on 8 January 2023 in a 1-1 FA Cup draw against Swansea City F.C. at Ashton Gate. He was on the bench again for the Championship match a week later against Birmingham City on 14 January 2023. He made his Bristol City debut on 17 January 2023 in the FA Cup third round replay replay against Swansea City as an extra time substitute as Bristol City won 2-1.

Career statistics

Club
.

References

Living people
2003 births
Welsh footballers
Bristol City F.C. players
Footballers from Newport, Wales